Edwin "Eddie" Halstead (1907–1962), formerly Edith Halstead, was an English athlete. Halstead won a silver medal in the women's javelin throw at the 1934 British Empire Games in London.

Halstead's sister Nellie also competed in the 1934 Games and won three medals.

Later, as part of a gender transition, Halstead changed his name to Edwin.

References

1907 births
1962 deaths
English javelin throwers
Commonwealth Games silver medallists for England
Commonwealth Games medallists in athletics
Athletes (track and field) at the 1934 British Empire Games
Transgender men
Transgender sportsmen
British transgender people
English LGBT sportspeople
LGBT track and field athletes
20th-century English LGBT people
Medallists at the 1934 British Empire Games